Care of or in care of can stand for:

 "care of" or "in care of", used to address a letter when the letter must pass through an intermediary
 "Care-of address", a temporary IP address for a mobile device used in Internet routing.
 "In Care Of", Mad Men (season 6), episode 13